is a former Japanese football player and manager.

Playing career
Miyamura was born in Tokyo on February 18, 1969. After graduating from high school, he joined Japan Soccer League club Yomiuri in 1987. However he could not play at all in the match in top team. In 1992, he moved to Japan Football League (JFL) club Fujita Industries. He played as defensive midfielder in 2 seasons. In 1994, he moved to JFL club Fujieda Blux (later Avispa Fukuoka). He played as regular player in 2 seasons and the club won the champions in 1995 and was promoted to J1 League from 1996. However his opportunity to play decreased from 1996. In 1998, he moved to JFL club Mito HollyHock. He played as regular player and retired end of 1998 season.

Coaching career
After retirement, Miyamura started coaching career at FC Machida in 1999. He coached for youth team until 2001. In 2002, he moved to L.League club Nippon TV Beleza. The club won the champions 2002 L.League and 2004 Empress's Cup. He resigned end of 2004 season.

Club statistics

References

External links

1969 births
Living people
Chuo University alumni
Association football people from Tokyo
Japanese footballers
Japan Soccer League players
J1 League players
Japan Football League (1992–1998) players
Tokyo Verdy players
Shonan Bellmare players
Avispa Fukuoka players
Mito HollyHock players
Nippon TV Tokyo Verdy Beleza managers
Association football midfielders